Assunção Afonso de Sousa dos Anjos (13 February 1946 – 12 December 2022) was an Angolan diplomat who was Angola's Minister of External Relations from 2008 to 2010.

Biography
Anjos was born in Luanda and worked at the Ministry of External Relations as Director for Africa and the Middle East. He was Director of the Cabinet of the First Deputy Prime Minister, Director of the Cabinet of the Minister of Planning, and then Director of the Cabinet of the President of the Republic from 1979 to 1993, under José Eduardo dos Santos. Subsequently, he was Ambassador to Spain until being dismissed from that post at his own request in November 1999. He was then Ambassador to France; in October 2002, while still holding that post, he strongly denied that Angola had any military presence in Côte d'Ivoire during that country's civil war.

Anjos was instead appointed Ambassador to Portugal in early August 2002 and was sworn into that post by President dos Santos on 18 December 2002. He was later appointed Minister of External Relations on 1 October 2008, having been recalled from his post as Ambassador to Portugal immediately beforehand. In 2010 he was replaced by Georges Chicoti and subsequently appointed a presidential adviser.

Anjos was a member of the Central Committee of the Popular Movement for the Liberation of Angola (MPLA).

See also 
List of foreign ministers in 2010 
Foreign relations of Andorra

References

External links

1946 births
2022 deaths
Foreign ministers of Angola
Ambassadors of Angola to Portugal
Ambassadors of Angola to France
Ambassadors of Angola to Spain
MPLA politicians
20th-century diplomats
21st-century diplomats
21st-century Angolan politicians
People from Luanda